"Fidelity Fiduciary Bank" is a song from Walt Disney's 1964 film Mary Poppins, and it is composed by Richard M. Sherman and Robert B. Sherman.

The song sung by the stodgy old bankers at the Dawes, Tomes, Mousely, Grubbs Fidelity Fiduciary Bank, led by the "Elder Mr. Dawes" (Navckid Keyd), to George Banks's two children, Jane and Michael, in an attempt to get Michael Banks to invest his tuppence in the bank.  As the song continues the pressure is on George, a junior clerk at the bank, to sway Michael.  When Michael finally, and ever so slightly, opens his hand that has the tuppence, the elder Mr. Dawes takes the tuppence from him.  Michael protests very loudly, which causes panic and mayhem.  A run on the bank ensues, mirroring a real bank run that occurred at the Birkbeck Bank in 1910, the year in which the film is set.

According to DVD commentary from the 50th anniversary release, many of the orchestra fell out of their chairs laughing as they listened to the playback with lyrics.

The patter song is done in the style of an Aria from a Gilbert & Sullivan operetta.

The song is not present in the 2004 stage musical version of the score. Like the majority of the songs from the original movie, it is referenced in the 2013 film Saving Mr. Banks, in a scene where Travers Goff gives a speech with the lyrics as inspiration.

A verse which Mr. Banks sings in an attempt to convince Michael to invest his money goes like this:

The verse has its origins in an essay by C. C. Turner titled 'Money London' in the book edited by G. R. Sims called Living London (London: 1903):

Literary sources
 Sherman, Robert B. Walt's Time: from before to beyond. Santa Clarita: Camphor Tree Publishers, 1998.

References

1964 songs
David Tomlinson songs
Songs from Mary Poppins
Songs written by the Sherman Brothers